Bowling is a surname. Notable people with the surname include:

 Ann Patricia Bowling (born 1951), British sociologist 
 Ann T. Bowling (1943–2000), American geneticist
 Bo Bowling (born 1987), American football player
 Dan Bowling (born 1946), Virginia state delegate
 Francis S. Bowling (1916–1997), justice of the Supreme Court of Mississippi
 Frank Bowling (born 1936), British artist
 John C. Bowling (fl. 1990s–2020s), president of Olivet Nazarene University in Bourbonnais, Illinois
 Victor Ray Bowling, American drag queen also known as Victoria "Porkchop" Parker